The eyebrowed thrush (Turdus obscurus) is a member of the thrush family Turdidae. The scientific name comes from Latin Turdus, "thrush" and obscurus "dark".

It breeds in dense coniferous forest and taiga eastwards from Siberia and Mongolia to Japan. It is strongly migratory, wintering south to China and Southeast Asia. It is a rare vagrant to western Europe.

It nests in trees, laying 4-6 eggs in a neat nest. Migrating birds and wintering birds often form small flocks. It is omnivorous, eating a wide range of insects, earthworms and berries.

This is an attractive thrush, with a grey back and head, the latter having a black eyeline, bordered white above and below. The breast and flanks are orange, and the belly white. The sexes are fairly similar, but immatures have a browner back.

The male has a simple whistling song, similar to the related mistle thrush.

In 2007 an eyebrowed thrush was sighted at the Jerusalem Bird Observatory in Jerusalem. This is the second recorded sighting in Israel; the first was at Eilat in October 1996.

In 2011, an eyebrowed thrush was sighted in Australia, near Malanda in Queensland. This is possibly the first confirmed sighting of the species on the Australian mainland.

Fossil record
In 2017, an assessment of late Pleistocene Indonesian passerines found a fossil of this species.

Gallery

References

eyebrowed thrush
Birds of North Asia
eyebrowed thrush
eyebrowed thrush